Raghiveh (also Romanized as Raghīveh, Ragheyveh, and Rogheyveh; also known as Ragiba, Raqeyveh, Raqībeh, Raqive, Raqīveh, Rīvār, Rogheyveh Ḩājī ‘Alī, and Rogheyveh Ḩājjī ‘Alī) is a village in Gazin Rural District, Raghiveh District, Haftgel County, Khuzestan Province, Iran. At the 2006 census, its population was 427, in 86 families.

References 

Populated places in Haftkel County